William Chester Crowder (February 26, 1898 – May 23, 1967) was an American Negro league pitcher in the 1920s.

A native of Cluster Springs, Virginia, Crowder played for the Lincoln Giants in 1920. He died in Wilkes-Barre, Pennsylvania in 1967 at age 69.

References

External links
Baseball statistics and player information from Baseball-Reference Black Baseball Stats and Seamheads

1898 births
1967 deaths
Lincoln Giants players
20th-century African-American sportspeople